Lewis Hanback (March 27, 1839 – September 7, 1897) was a U.S. Representative from Kansas.

Born in Winchester, Illinois, Hanback attended the common schools and Cherry Grove Seminary in Knox County, Illinois, for three years.
He taught school in Morgan County, Illinois, in 1860 and 1861.
During the Civil War he enlisted as a private in the Illinois Volunteer Infantry and was promoted to brigade inspector.
He studied law in Albany, New York.
He returned to Illinois and from there moved to Topeka, Kansas.
He was admitted to the bar in 1865 and practiced.

Hanback was elected Justice of the Peace in 1867.
He was Probate judge of Shawnee County from 1868-1872.
He served as assistant chief clerk of the State house of representatives.
He served as assistant secretary of the State senate in 1877.
He served as assistant United States district attorney of Kansas 1877-1879.
He served as Receiver of public moneys at Salina, Kansas.

Hanback was elected as a Republican to the Forty-eighth and Forty-ninth Congresses (March 4, 1883 – March 3, 1887).
He was an unsuccessful candidate for re-election to the Fiftieth Congress.
He resumed the practice of law.
He died in Kansas City, Kansas, September 7, 1897.
He was interred in Topeka Cemetery, Topeka, Kansas.

References

1839 births
1897 deaths
Kansas state court judges
Union Army personnel
Republican Party members of the United States House of Representatives from Kansas
19th-century American politicians
 People from Morgan County, Illinois
People from Winchester, Illinois
19th-century American judges
People buried in Topeka Cemetery